Snake Creek is a census-designated place (CDP) in Mayes County, Oklahoma, United States. The population was 255 at the 2020 census.

Geography
Snake Creek is located at  (36.185531, -95.087011).

Demographics

As of the census of 2000, there were 298 people, 103 households, and 80 families residing in the CDP. The population density was 35.8 people per square mile (13.8/km2). There were 109 housing units at an average density of 13.1/sq mi (5.1/km2). The racial makeup of the CDP was 73.15% White, 25.50% Native American, and 1.34% from two or more races.

There were 103 households, out of which 32.0% had children under the age of 18 living with them, 72.8% were married couples living together, 3.9% had a female householder with no husband present, and 21.4% were non-families. 19.4% of all households were made up of individuals, and 3.9% had someone living alone who was 65 years of age or older. The average household size was 2.89 and the average family size was 3.31.

In the CDP, the population was spread out, with 27.5% under the age of 18, 10.4% from 18 to 24, 25.8% from 25 to 44, 29.2% from 45 to 64, and 7.0% who were 65 years of age or older. The median age was 34 years. For every 100 females, there were 109.9 males. For every 100 females age 18 and over, there were 109.7 males.

The median income for a household in the CDP was $31,813, and the median income for a family was $32,500. Males had a median income of $23,194 versus $11,328 for females. The per capita income for the CDP was $14,300. None of the population or families were below the poverty line.

References

Census-designated places in Mayes County, Oklahoma
Census-designated places in Oklahoma